In general relativity the Kantowski-Sachs metric (named after Ronald Kantowski and Rainer K. Sachs) describes a homogeneous but anisotropic universe whose spatial section has the topology of . The metric is:

Remarkably, the isometry group does not act simply transitively on spacetime, nor does it possess a subgroup with simple transitive action.

See also
Bianchi classification
Dust solution

Notes

General relativity
Physical cosmology